COROS Wearables Inc. is a Chinese company specialising in performance sports wearables. The company has its headquarters in Irvine, CA, United States, as well as smaller offices across Europe and China. COROS produces its wearables in Dongguan, Guangzhou, China.

The company specialises in the design, manufacturing, and retailing of specialist performance-focused GPS sport watches for outdoor sports. It focus mainly on several categories of running: Track, Trail, Road, and Ultra running. COROS used to have an established range of smart bicycle helmets with safety design features for mountain, road, and urban cyclists.

History 
In 2016, COROS released its first product: the LINX Smart Cycling Helmet after 2,135 backers pledged $319,765 on Kickstarter. The Kickstarter campaign for LINX achieved 639 per cent of its funding goal, making it one of the most successful campaigns of its kind. COROS went on to release its OMNI, and also SafeSound smart helmets in 2018.

After successes in the cycling industry, on May 15, 2018, COROS launched its first GPS watch - The PACE Multisport GPS Watch, which had a built-in first-of-its-kind dedicated 'Track Mode' designed for track runners to get accurate pace, distance, and time data – where GPS tracking had originally failed.

Later that year, the company released two new watches, the APEX Premium Multisport Watch, in two sizes; 42mm, 46mm.

In 2020, COROS launched PACE 2 - the lightest GPS watch at that moment - and announced partnerships with Eliud Kipchoge, Emma Coburn and Des Linden.

Operations 
COROS' main operations are within North America, as well as mainland China. The company also operates from its Dutch entity COROS Netherlands B.V which serves the European Economic Area (EEA).

References

External links 
Official website

Watch brands
Sports equipment
Wearable devices